Tomasz Swędrowski may refer to:

Tomasz Swędrowski (footballer) (born 1993), Polish football midfielder
 (born 1960), Polish volleyball player, journalist, and sports broadcaster